Oskar Bertil Petrus Jansson (29 June 1898 – 25 September 1981) was a Swedish athlete. He competed in the shot put at the 1920 and 1924 Summer Olympics and finished in ninth and eighth place, respectively.

Jansson won the Swedish shot put title in 1916 and 1918–1929 and the English one in 1919 and 1921. In 1918 he also competed domestically in decathlon.

References

1898 births
1981 deaths
Swedish male shot putters
Olympic athletes of Sweden
Athletes (track and field) at the 1920 Summer Olympics
Athletes (track and field) at the 1924 Summer Olympics
Sportspeople from Jönköping